Łukasik is a gender-neutral Polish surname that may refer to:

 Andrzej Łukasik (born 1955), Polish jazz musician
 Anna Łukasik (born 1987), Polish dressage rider
 Daniel Łukasik (born 1991), Polish football midfielder
 Joseph Lukasik (born 1962), American composer 
 Justyna Łukasik (born 1993), Polish volleyball player
 Martyna Łukasik (born 1999), Polish volleyball player
 Stephen J. Lukasik (born 1931), American physicist

Polish-language surnames